

Buildings and structures

Buildings
 From c. 1190 – 'Cliff Palace' in Mesa Verde (modern-day Colorado) constructed by Ancestral Puebloans of the Pueblo III Era.
 1191 – St. Gereon's Basilica in Cologne, Holy Roman Empire, consecrated.
 1191 – Preah Khan Baray built in Angkor, Khmer Empire.
 1192 – Torpo Stave Church, Norway, built.
 1192 – Rebuilding of Lincoln Cathedral begun.
 c. 1192 – Qutb Minar (minaret), Delhi, India.
 1192–April 1199 – Adhai Din Ka Jhonpra mosque in Ajmer, Rajasthan, rebuilt from a Sanskrit college.
 1193 – Construction of the Quwwat-ul-Islam Mosque begun in the Delhi Sultanate.
 c. 1194 – Minaret of Jam, probably at Firozkoh, Ghor (modern-day Afghanistan) built.
 1194 – Rebuilding of Chartres Cathedral begun.
 1195 – Rebuilding of Bourges Cathedral begun.
 c. 1195 – Theotokos Kyriotissa Church built in Constantinople.
 1196 – Baptistery of Parma constructed.
 1196 – Minaret of the Koutoubia Mosque completed in Marrakesh, Almohad Morocco.
 1196–1198 – Château Gaillard built in Normandy.
 1197 – San Nicola di Bari, in the Kingdom of Sicily completed (begun in 1084).
 1197 – St. Mungo's Cathedral, Glasgow, Scotland consecrated.
 1197 – West Front of the Ely Cathedral finished (begun in 1174).
 1198 – Dhammayazika Pagoda built in Bagan, Pagan Kingdom (begun in 1196).
 1199 – St Laurence's Church, Ludlow, in England rebuilt.
 Exact date not specified
 Arabic Baths, Girona, Catalonia constructed.
 Neak Pean temple built on an island in the middle of Preah Khan Baray in Angkor.

References

12th-century architecture
1190s works